Southeast Asia uses various non-Latin-based writing systems. The writing systems below are listed by language family.

Austroasiatic languages

Khmer script (for Khmer language)
Khom script (for Bahnaric languages)
Chữ Nôm (historical writing for Vietnamese language)
Mon script (for Mon language)

Austronesian languages

Most Austronesian languages use Latin script today. Some non-Latin-based writing systems are listed below.

Jawi alphabet (for Malay and a number of other languages)
Cham script (for Cham language)
Eskayan script (for Eskayan language)
Kawi script (used across Maritime Southeast Asia)
Balinese script
Batak script
Baybayin
Buhid script
Hanunó'o script
Kulitan alphabet (for Kapampangan language)
Tagbanwa script
Javanese script
Lontara script
Makasar script
Old Sundanese script
Sundanese script
Rejang script
Rencong script
Buda script

Hmong-Mien languages

Romanized Popular Alphabet (Hmong RPA)
Pollard script
Pahawh Hmong
Nyiakeng Puachue Hmong
Eebee Hmong

Kra-Dai languages

Many Southwestern Tai languages are written using Brāhmī-derived alphabets. Zhuang languages were traditionally written with Chinese characters, but are now usually written with romanized alphabets.

Thai script
Lao script
Sawndip
Shan script
Tai Viet script
Tai Le script
New Tai Lue alphabet
Tai Tham script
Tai Yo script

Tibeto-Burman languages

Burmese alphabet
S'gaw Karen alphabet
Ersu Shaba
Kayah Li alphabet
Fraser alphabet (used to write the Lisu language)
Naxi script
Geba syllabary
Dongba symbols
Zomi script
Tangut script
Tibetan script
Tujia script
Yi script

See also
Classification schemes for Southeast Asian languages
Writing systems of Africa

References

Writing systems
Languages of Southeast Asia